Lowell Green (born 7 July 1936) is a Canadian radio personality, journalist, and author, best known as the host of The Lowell Green Show, a conservative morning talk show that aired on the Ottawa Ontario radio station CFRA.  He has written newspaper articles and autobiographical, historical and fictional books.

He was born in Ann Arbor, Michigan, United States, to Canadian parents, and immigrated to Canada.  He graduated from Macdonald Agricultural College of McGill University in Montreal Quebec in 1956.

Career 
Green started his radio broadcasting career in Brantford, Ontario, and subsequently moved to radio stations in Sudbury Ontario and Montreal Quebec.  In 1960, he was hired by G. Campbell McDonald at CFRA as a news and farm reporter.  In 1966, he began hosting Greenline, and eventually became the longest-running open-line talk show host in North America. He retired briefly from radio in the 1980s, but returned in 1990.  Two of his historic broadcasts are being preserved at Library and Archives Canada.

In 1993, he returned to CFRA and hosted The Lowell Green Show until his official retirement on 4 January 2016.  He continued contributing to the station's weekly midday program News and Views with Rob Snow until a Bell Media restructuring in mid-November 2019. On occasion, he can be heard calling into The Rob Snow Show, now airing on CIWW.

On 31 December 2019, in an emotional farewell, Green ended his radio career on CFRA with the following final words:“I believe, that we all have a responsibility, more than that, we have a duty, to do whatever we can, in whatever fashion we can, to make a better world for our children. And CFRA Nation, you have done your duty, and I hope and pray that you'll continue to do so. Thank you all, goodbye.”On 14 September 2020, Green returned online with The Island of Sanity, a one-hour podcast available on various internet platforms, which was pared down to thirty minutes on 13 October 2020 and featured live on internet radio and the social networking platform Facebook.

Accomplishments 
In a late 1960s protest, Green urged his listeners to fill bottles of water taken from the polluted Rideau River, and to ship them to the Ontario legislature at Queen's Park.  His listeners shipped many bottles and containers of polluted water.  Canada Post objected, and stopped accepting them.  According to Green, the uproar led to the creation of the Rideau Valley Conservation Authority and the start of a clean-up effort of the Rideau River and the Ottawa River.

With his 1967 Save The Centennial Flame Campaign, a month of relentless broadcasts, and over three-thousand petitions from listeners, the iconic Centennial Flame remains and continues to shine on Parliament Hill.

In 1975, after the school shooting that occurred at the St. Pius X High School in Ottawa, Green and thousands of his supporters joined his Fire Arms Safety Association.  It lobbied and petitioned Members of Parliament, while he appeared before parliamentary and senate committees tasked with the process of making policy and enacting new gun law legislation in Canada. In order to encourage Quebecers to vote "No" in the 1995 Quebec Independence referendum, he promoted and helped organize a political Unity Rally which was held in Place du Canada in Montreal Quebec.

With the Reverend Norman Johnston, he founded the Ottawa chapter of the Big Brothers and was founder of the Help Santa Toy Parade in Ottawa.  He has contributed to ongoing efforts to help modernize and renovate the Saint Vincent Hospital and the Élisabeth Bruyère Hospital in Ottawa.  He was a founder of the Sunday Herald in Ottawa which was in 1988 purchased by the Ottawa Sun.

Green has served on the boards of the United Way, the John Howard Society, the Drug Addiction Research Council, and on the town council in West Hull Quebec.

Honours and awards 
Lowell Green has received several awards, including one for his 1958 coverage of the Springhill mining disaster in Nova Scotia, and one from the International Olympic Commission for broadcasts made from the 1976 Summer Olympic Games while working in Montreal. He has received the Friendship Award from the Royal Canadian Legion, the Chief of Defence staff medallion, and the Senate 150th Anniversary Medal.  He has been decorated with both the Queen Elizabeth II Golden Jubilee Medal, and the Queen Elizabeth II Diamond Jubilee Medal.

After raising CA$280 thousand during an on-air campaign for a little boy requiring life-saving medical treatment in the United States, he was presented with the Helen Keller Fellowship Award from Lions International. In 2006, he was awarded the LIfetime Achievement Award from the Radio and Television News Director Association. He has also been awarded the Golden Ribbon Award For Outstanding Community Service by the Canadian Association of Broadcasters.

He has received citations from Prime Minister John Diefendbaker, Prime Minister Lester B. Pearson, Prime Minister Pierre Trudeau, and Prime Minister Stephen Harper. On 21 November 2017, he was honoured in the House of Commons of Canada by the Honourable Pierre Poilievre. Lowell Green has also received the Community Builders Award displayed at Ottawa City Hall, and has an Ottawa hospital wing and an Ottawa day named in his honour.

Politics 
In 1968, Green attempted to win the Liberal nomination for the federal riding of Pontiac during the 1968 federal election, but lost this bid to Thomas Lefebvre. On 13 December 1984, Green ran for the Ontario Liberal Party in a provincial by-election in Ottawa Centre. The by-election was called after NDP Michael Cassidy resigned his seat. He came third, losing to NDP candidate Evelyn Gigantes. Green blamed this loss on his "sharp" personality and a low voter turnout. On 24 October 2020, Green publicly endorsed Matthew Fisher, a former journalist who was a foreign correspondent for The Globe and Mail, Sun Media and Postmedia Network for 34 years, to become the Conservative MP for Kanata—Carleton.

Books
The following is a list of works authored by Lowell Green.  His latest book “Amazing But True! 150 Fascinating Stories About Canada”, was in 2017 nominated for the Governor General's Pierre Burton Award, presented annually by Canada's National History Society for works celebrating Canadian history.  He has also received the Canada Book Award which recognizes and promotes Canadian authors.
 Death in October. Renfrew, Ontario: General Store, 1996. 
 The Pork Chop and Other Stories: A Memoir. Carp, Ontario: Creative Bound Resources, 2005. 
 How the Granola-crunching, Tree-hugging Thug Huggers are Wrecking Our Country! Carp, Ontario: Creative Bound Resources, 2006. 
 It's Hard to Say Goodbye. Carp, Ontario: Creative Bound Resources, 2007. 
 Hoodwinked: The Spy Who Didn't Die. Carp, Ontario: Spruce Ridge, 2009. 
 Mayday. Mayday: curb immigration and stop multiculturalism, or it's the end of the Canada we know. Carp, Ontario: Spruce Ridge, 2010. 
 Here's proof only we conservatives have our heads screwed on straight. Carp, Ontario: Spruce Ridge, 2011. 
 Why Now Is The Perfect Time to Wave a Friendly Goodbye to Quebec. Carp, Ontario: Spruce Ridge, 2013. 
 Amazing But True!: 150 Fascinating Stories About Canada! Carp, Ontario: Spruce Ridge, 2017. 
 Common Sense for a Wounded Nation. Carp, Ontario: Spruce Ridge Publishing Inc, 2020.

Controversy 
Green has been controversial at times. Several complaints have been made against him to the Canadian Broadcast Standards Council (CBSC). In a 1994 complaint to the CBSC, listeners alleged that Green had been rude and abusive to a caller who identified herself as a Christian. Although the CBSC determined that Green's conduct had contravened its guidelines on discrimination, it also decided that the station had responded appropriately, and the group did not prescribe any further action. In 2006 and 2008, the council censured Green for his treatment of a Muslim man who challenged Green on the way the radio show host portrays Islam. In June 2017, there was controversy as to whether Indigo Books and Music had pulled Green's latest book, Amazing But True!, from its bookshelves in stores in Canada.

References

External links
 
 CTV Ottawa on Lowell Green's retirement
 Lowell Green at Facebook
 CBSC 2008 decision
 CBSC 2006 decision
 CBSC 1994 decision

1936 births
Canadian non-fiction writers
Canadian people of Irish descent
Canadian talk radio hosts
Living people
McGill University Faculty of Agricultural and Environmental Sciences alumni
Ontario Liberal Party candidates in Ontario provincial elections
Writers from Ann Arbor, Michigan
Writers from Ottawa